Nortorf may refer to:

 Nortorf, a town in the district of Rendsburg-Eckernförde, in Schleswig-Holstein, Germany.
 Nortorf, Steinburg, is a municipality in the district of Steinburg, in Schleswig-Holstein, Germany.
 Schülp bei Nortorf, a municipality in the district of Rendsburg-Eckernförde, in Schleswig-Holstein, Germany